Mohammed Fellah (born 24 May 1989) is a Norwegian footballer who currently is a free agent.

Club career

Early career and Vålerenga 
Fellah was born in Oslo to Moroccan parents from Al Hoceima and was raised in Holmlia, a multicultural satellite town in southern part of Oslo. He started his football career with local side Holmlia SK before being discovered by Vålerenga. Fellah scored in his debut for Vålerenga in Tippeligaen. on 10 September 2006 in a match against Fredrikstad.

When the Norway U18 team met Turkey twice in three days in August 2007, Fellah was badly injured in a challenge with Serdar Aziz in the second game and broke his calf bone. He required surgery, and lost the rest of the 2007 season. The injury would not heal properly, and during the fall of 2008 he had to operate again. Fellah came back fully in the 2009 season playing a total of 23 games in Tippeligaen.

Fellah started Vålerenga's first 14 matches in Tippeligaen in the 2010 season and was voted "man of the match" in three of the games by Norwegian newspaper Verdens Gang.

Esbjerg
In August 2013 Fellah moved to Danish Superliga side Esbjerg fB on a three-year contract.

Nordsjælland
In May 2016, Fellah moved to Danish Superliga side FC Nordsjælland on a three-year contract.

Sandefjord
On 31 August 2018 Fellah signed a one year deal with Sandefjord.

Return to Vålerenga
In September 2019, Fellah returned to Vålerenga.

International career

Youth
Fellah is of Moroccan descent, but has represented Norway at youth international level. He played for the Norway U-17 national team in qualifiers for the 2006 UEFA European U-17 Championship, scoring the first goal for Norway in their 3–1 win over Liechtenstein.

Senior
When Fellah was left out of the Norwegian national team squad for the 2012 King's Cup, which only consisted of players playing in Scandinavia, he stated that he wanted to play Morocco instead of Norway. One year later he was called up for the Norwegian squad for the friendly matches against South Africa and Zambia in January 2013, and said that he now wanted to play for Norway. He made his debut for Norway against South Africa on 8 January 2013, and started the match against Zambia four days later.

Career statistics

References

External links
 Fellah: "I play to entertain" 
 Player profile on EuroRivals.net
 Players profile on altomfotball.no 
 

1989 births
Living people
Footballers from Oslo
Norwegian people of Moroccan descent
Norwegian footballers
Norway international footballers
Norway under-21 international footballers
Norway youth international footballers
Association football midfielders
Vålerenga Fotball players
Eliteserien players
Esbjerg fB players
Danish Superliga players
Norwegian expatriate footballers
Expatriate men's footballers in Denmark
Norwegian expatriate sportspeople in Denmark
Holmlia SK players